Nakayama Shinnosuke (中山 眞之亮, June 19, 1866 – December 31, 1914) was the first Shinbashira of Tenrikyo. He was the grandson of Nakayama Miki, the foundress of Tenrikyo.

Biography
According to Tenrikyo tradition, Nakayama Miki named Shinnosuke and designated him the Shinbashira while he was still in the womb. He was born to parents Kajimoto Sojiro and Haru in the second year of the Japanese era Keiō, on the seventh day of the fifth month, which corresponds to June 19, 1866 in the Gregorian calendar. Shinnosuke was raised in the Kajimoto household in Ichinomoto Village until 1880, when Shinnosuke began to reside at the Nakayama household. Shinnosuke was officially adopted into the Nakayama family on September 23, 1881, and became the family's legal successor on September 22, 1882.

In 1896, Shinnosuke wrote the Oyasama gyoden ("The Biography of Oyasama"), the text on which Tenrikyo Church Headquarters' official biography of  Nakayama Miki, The Life of Oyasama, would be based.

Further reading
  
Ueda, Y. (1997). Kōhon Nakayama Shinnosuke den [Biography of Nakayama Shinnosuke, manuscript edition]. Tenri, Japan: Tenrikyō Dōyūsha.

References

Tenrikyo